Marcel Boucher (1898–1965) was a French jeweller. In the early 1920s, he moved to New York City, where he developed a passion for jewellery design, studying under Pierre Cartier as an apprentice. By the 1930s, he was working for Mazer Brothers. However, in 1937 he decided to establish his own company, which he called Marcel Boucher and Cie.

Costume jewellery by Boucher 
Jewelry by Boucher is almost always signed (meaning a marking signifying authenticity was put on the piece) and has an inventory number on it somewhere. Some of the earliest marks say 'Marboux' or 'MB.'

Boucher used white metal in his pieces, but the entry of the US in World War II meant that metal was scarce. At that point, Boucher began using silver in his work, even moving to Mexico for a brief stint to utilize the silver there.

His pins were often made to look 3D, sometimes with several layers.

Boucher's death 
In 1965, Boucher died, and his wife Sandra (who had worked for Harry Winston) took over her husband's company. The company was made a subsidiary sometime between 1970-1972 of Davorn Industries.

References

External links 
 Biographical info
 Signatures, Dating techniques, Example photos

French jewellery designers
1898 births
1965 deaths
French jewellers